Cambaroides schrenckii is a species of crayfish endemic to north-eastern China and Russia. It is a freshwater species that also occurs in some brackish water areas. It occurs in habitats with still water, typically no more than 1 metre deep. It was named after Leopold von Schrenck.

References

Cambaridae
Crustaceans described in 1874
Freshwater crustaceans of Asia
Arthropods of China
Invertebrates of Russia
Fauna of Siberia